The Second Battle of Jenné was a military engagement between the armies of the Tukulor Empire and the French Third Republic.  It was the last major battle in the Franco-Tukulor Wars. The French won a decisive victory, forcing Ahmadu Tall to flee to the Sokoto Caliphate in what is now Nigeria. The already waning Tukulor Empire fell apart as a result.

See also
First Battle of Jenné
Tukulor Empire
History of Mali

References

Sources

Battles involving France
Conflicts in 1893
April 1893 events
Toucouleur Empire
19th-century military history of France